Creed was an American rock band from Tallahassee, Florida. Active from 1994 to 2004, and then from 2009 to 2012, Creed was prominent in the post-grunge movement of the mid-1990s. The band released three consecutive multi-platinum albums, with their album Human Clay being certified diamond. Creed has sold over 28 million records in the United States, has sold over 53 million albums worldwide, and was the ninth best-selling artist of the first decade of the 2000s. However, Creed has been panned by some critics and listeners; readers of Rolling Stone magazine ranked the band the worst artist of the 1990s.

For most of its existence, the band consisted of lead vocalist Scott Stapp, guitarist and vocalist Mark Tremonti, bassist Brian Marshall, and drummer Scott Phillips. Creed released two studio albums, My Own Prison in 1997 and Human Clay in 1999, before Marshall left the band in 2000. The band's third album, Weathered, was released in 2001, with Tremonti on bass guitar. Creed disbanded in 2004; Stapp pursued a solo career while Tremonti, Marshall, and Phillips founded the band Alter Bridge with Myles Kennedy.

In 2009, Creed reunited for a fourth album, Full Circle, then toured until 2012. Since then, Creed has been on hiatus while the instrumental members have remained active with Alter Bridge; Stapp has continued his solo career and joined the band Art of Anarchy in 2016. Tremonti also formed his own band, Tremonti, in 2011.

History

Early years (1994–1996)

Creed began in 1994 in Tallahassee, Florida. Founding members vocalist Scott Stapp and guitarist Mark Tremonti had been classmates in high school and friends at Florida State University. Stapp and Tremonti realized that they had a mutual love of writing music and performing. After multiple discussions and times spent writing songs, several of which addressed themes of Christian theology and spirituality due to Stapp's spiritual background as the stepson of a Pentecostal minister, the duo held auditions that led to the recruitment of bassist Brian Marshall, drummer Scott Phillips, and rhythm guitarist Brian Brasher to complete the quintet. This five-piece line-up lasted through 1994, and Brasher left the band in 1995. Creed  decided to remain as a four-piece band. The four musicians had already written and collaborated on four of the songs that would go on to become tracks on Creed's chart-topping debut album, My Own Prison. The band found local success and started to play shows in bars and small venues throughout Tallahassee. Stapp wrote in 2012 that Creed first performed as "Naked Toddler" at Yianni's in Tallahassee; the name was picked up by Tremonti from a headline in that day's newspaper, but the reaction that night to the name was negative. The group was trying to find inspiration for a better name when Marshall said he had been in a band called Mattox Creed. Stapp latched onto the Creed part, and the band agreed.

My Own Prison and rise to fame (1997–1998)
Wanting "a real show at a club", they managed to persuade the owner of a bar in Tallahassee to book them by claiming that they could guarantee an audience of 200 people. Owner and manager Jeff Hanson later told HitQuarters that the band had played mostly cover versions, but two original songs stood out and impressed the manager so much that he promptly signed them to his management and promotions company and set about developing their act. For their first recordings he matched the band up with John Kurzweg, a producer and friend of Hanson's who he felt was an appropriate fit. Together they recorded their debut album for $6,000, which was funded by Hanson. The album, titled My Own Prison, was initially self-released on their own label, Blue Collar Records, selling 6,000 copies throughout the state of Florida.

My Own Prison had been circulating around the music industry for a while when, in May 1997, Diana Meltzer from Wind-Up Records heard the album and decided almost immediately that she wanted to sign them to the label, which had creative issues with Baboon over the latter's reluctance to alter their image and sound to suit the label's demands. Meltzer later said that she heard "an arena band". Within the same week, Meltzer, together with Wind-up president Steve Lerner, CEO Alan Meltzer, and A&R representative Joel Mark, flew to Tallahassee to see Creed perform live and decide for certain whether to offer them a contract. "Seeing the energy in the room when Scott Stapp stepped up to the mic, and hearing his powerful voice fill the room, alongside Mark Tremonti's now legendary guitar riffs and that big Creed anthemic rock sound, was all I needed," she told HitQuarters. According to Tremonti in his "Wikipedia: Fact or Fiction" video in 2015, Creed had been rejected by Atlantic and Cherry Universal Records before Wind-Up flew down to sign them. The band has been signed with Wind-Up records ever since. Stapp and Marshall originally signed the contract in blood; causing it to need to be reprinted.

My Own Prison was remixed, given a more radio-friendly sound, and re-released by Wind-up Records in August 1997. Four singles were released from the album: "My Own Prison", "Torn", "What's This Life For", and "One". Each of these songs reached No. 1 on the Billboard Hot Mainstream Rock Tracks chart, making Creed the first band to accomplish such a feat with a debut album. With little MTV exposure, media coverage, or label support, My Own Prison sold extremely well, moving over six million copies and going six times platinum. Creed continued to top year-end charts and was recognized as the Rock Artist of the Year at the 1998 Billboard Music Awards. My Own Prison was also the highest-selling heavy music record of 1998 on Nielsen SoundScan's Hard Music chart. The band's hit song "My Own Prison" was also featured as a live performance on the charity album Live in the X Lounge in 1998. The band covered Alice Cooper's song "I'm Eighteen" for The Faculty soundtrack in 1998. Critical reception toward My Own Prison was mostly favorable. Stephen Thomas Erlewine from AllMusic gave it four out of five stars and said that Creed "work well within their chicken tender dinner" despite "basically [falling] into the category of post-Seattle bands who temper their grunge with a dose of Live earnestness." The album lyrically deals with themes of questioning and struggling with faith and spirituality.

Human Clay and Marshall's departure (1999–2000)
With money made from My Own Prison, the band started to write for their second album, Human Clay. The album's first single, "Higher", spent a record-breaking 17 weeks on the top of the rock radio charts. In 2009, "Higher" was ranked as the 95th greatest hard rock song of all time by VH1. The album was released in 1999, when My Own Prison was still doing reasonably well. However, Human Clay was an instant and overwhelming success debuting at No. 1 on the Billboard 200 and selling over ten million copies over the next two years, allowing it to become one of the few rock albums to be certified diamond by the RIAA. The album was the band's first to hit No. 1 in the U.S., where it debuted with first week sales of 315,000, and stayed on top for two weeks. After the album's release, three follow-up singles were released in 2000: "What If", "With Arms Wide Open", and "Are You Ready?". The first three of those topped radio charts, giving Creed a total of seven chart-topping singles. The band would later go on to win their first, and to date only, Grammy Award for "With Arms Wide Open" for Best Rock Song in 2001.

Reviews for Human Clay were largely positive. Stephen Thomas Erlewine from AllMusic said that the record "does make it clear that there is an audience for post-grunge hard rock, as long as it's delivered without pretension and as long as it meets the audience's desire for straight-ahead, hard-hitting music." The lyrical content of Human Clay is a slight departure from that of My Own Prison, touching on subjects such as fatherhood ("With Arms Wide Open") and lucid dreaming ("Higher"), as well as darker, more violent themes such as sexual abuse ("Wash Away Those Years") and hostility ("What If").

During the summer of 2000, bassist Brian Marshall began a spiral into alcoholism. The band had a meeting with management to discuss Marshall's future. Stapp and Tremonti supported the idea of Marshall going to rehab and attempted to talk Marshall into going, but he refused. Initially, the public thought Marshall was let go because he criticized Pearl Jam frontman Eddie Vedder in a radio interview with KNDD in June 2000, claiming that Scott Stapp is a better songwriter, and criticized Pearl Jam's recent albums for "having songs without hooks." Stapp later distanced the rest of the band from Marshall's comments and stated, "Yes, we get tired of the PJ question, but there is no excuse for the arrogance and stupidity [of Marshall]. I ask you all not to judge Creed as a band, because the statements made were not the band's feelings, they were Brian's. I'm sorry if Brian offended anyone, and he has already apologized for his comments." Although it was reported that Marshall left Creed "on friendly terms", he did not. Tremonti and Stapp were concerned for Marshall and their collective friendships, but soon after the controversy, Marshall formed a new band called Grand Luxx with his old Mattox Creed bandmates. Stapp stated that Marshall's leaving was his choice and was unrelated to the Pearl Jam comments. Brett Hestla, from the band Virgos Merlot, replaced Marshall.

Weathered and break-up (2001–2004)
Creed worked on their third album for most of 2001, with Tremonti choosing to play bass on the record to "[preserve] the band's initial core," although Hestla remained in Creed's touring lineup. Weathered was released on November 20, 2001. Six singles were released from the album: "My Sacrifice" (which earned the band a nomination for a Grammy Award for Best Rock Performance by a Duo or Group with Vocal in 2003), "Bullets", "One Last Breath", "Hide", "Don't Stop Dancing", and "Weathered". The album was a commercial bestseller and was certified platinum six times over and debuted at No. 1 on the Billboard Top 200. It remained at that spot for eight weeks, a record which Creed notably shares with The Beatles. The tour to promote Weathered was met with considerable controversy; it was delayed in April 2002 when Stapp suffered a concussion and vertebrae damage after being involved in a car crash. As a result, in addition to his growing addiction to alcohol, he became addicted to pain medication.
This, along with other events, led to a considerably controversial concert on December 29, 2002, at the Allstate Arena in Rosemont, Illinois, which ultimately led to the band's disunion. Four disappointed concertgoers filed a lawsuit against the band, claiming that Scott Stapp "was so intoxicated and/or medicated that he was unable to sing the lyrics of a single Creed song." Creed later issued an apology on Stapp's behalf, although Stapp would later deny the claims. Ultimately, the case was dismissed. Stapp later confirmed that he was intoxicated during the concert, but asserted that he was not incoherent.

After remaining inactive for over a year, it was announced in June 2004 that Creed had disbanded. Tremonti cited tensions between Stapp and the rest of the band as the reasoning. He said that the relationship with Stapp had become so strained that the creative juices were no longer flowing. The reality was that Stapp was in Maui battling his addiction to alcohol and drugs. Almost simultaneous with the announcement of Creed's break-up, Stapp opted for a solo career. On November 22, 2004, Wind-up Records released Creed's Greatest Hits album. Stapp released his debut solo album The Great Divide in 2005. Tremonti and Phillips reunited with Marshall to form a new band, Alter Bridge, in 2004 with singer Myles Kennedy, formerly of American rock band The Mayfield Four.

Reunion, Full Circle and 2012 tour (2009–2012)

While Tremonti referred to Creed as "officially in our past" in 2006, years later, on April 27, 2009, Creed's website announced that the band had reunited for a new tour and plans for a new album. According to Tremonti, "We're all very excited to reconnect with our fans and each other after seven long years." He later added that being in Creed again was "the last thing [he] expected." Phillips also stated: "Our career as Creed came to a very abrupt and unforeseen ending. After reflecting on some of the greatest personal and professional moments of our lives, we've come to realize that we are still very capable of continuing that career and our friendship on a grander scale than ever before." In an interview for People magazine, Stapp elaborated on the reunion, saying, "We never felt like we weren't together. We're not looking at this as a reunion. It's more of a rebirth."

In June 2009, Creed performed with Marshall on bass for the first time in eight years on Sessions@AOL, showing the band playing four of their hits. In addition, the band performed live on Fox & Friends on June 26, 2009. Creed's reunion tour, with touring guitarist Eric Friedman, kicked off on August 6, 2009, and concluded on October 20. Full Circle, Creed's first album in eight years, came out on October 27, 2009. Stapp elaborated on the title, which is also the name of a track to appear on the album: "It really defines and articulates, melody-wise and lyrically, what's happened with us. We've come full circle and it's a great place to be." The first single from Full Circle, "Overcome", was posted on the band's official website on August 18, 2009, the same day the radio premiere started along with its release as a digital download on August 25. The second single, "Rain", was released to radio stations on September 23 and became available on October 6, 2009, as another digital download. The third single, "A Thousand Faces", was released in 2010.

On September 25, 2009, Creed performed a concert in Houston, Texas that was recorded, broadcast via a live internet stream, and released on December 8, 2010, as a concert film titled Creed Live, the band's first live recording. The performance broke four world records, including the world record for the most cameras used at a live music event (239). The previous holder of this record was Justin Timberlake. The performance also featured the first usage of the "big freeze" technology, popularized by the 1999 film The Matrix, in a concert environment. Drummer Scott Phillips also confirmed that Full Circle will not be the band's final album. The same announcement confirmed that Creed was to go on a world tour in support of Full Circle between April and September 2010, starting with an Australia/New Zealand tour, followed by South America, Europe, and North America. The tour was called The 20-10 Tour. Tickets for the tour were ten and twenty dollars to stand up against rising concert ticket prices. The first 2,010 tickets purchased for every concert did not include any service fees. Despite these efforts, not every show sold out, and critical reviews were mostly mixed. Skillet joined the tour as main support.

Creed reconvened in late 2011 and early 2012 to begin work on a potential fifth studio album. A tour was also announced in which the band would perform their first two albums, My Own Prison and Human Clay, from front to back over the course of two nights, with selected tracks from Weathered and Full Circle also featured. This tour kicked off with two shows on April 12 and 13, 2012, at the Chicago Theatre in Chicago, Illinois, with the band performing My Own Prison the first night and Human Clay the second. They also toured in South America and Indonesia.

Hiatus (2013–present) 
The band has been on hiatus since 2013.  In October 2013, Stapp noted in an interview that extensive work was done on a fifth album throughout 2011 and 2012. However, the project was subsequently abandoned. Stapp has maintained that Creed is "still a band." He also said that he's open to continuing to work with Creed when the time is right.

In June 2015, while promoting his second solo album Cauterize, Mark Tremonti claimed in an interview with Kerrang that he "[hasn't] been a close friend of Scott's in 9 years". The other members did not speak to Stapp throughout the South American Tour in 2012 and plans for their fifth studio album were shelved, and they continued to work with Myles Kennedy in Alter Bridge.

In September 2015, Stapp appeared on the Dr. Oz Show. When asked about a Creed reunion, Stapp replied: "I can tell you what, I sure hope so. I love the guys with all my heart and if they're watching, 'Come on guys, let's make a record.'" He later doubled down on the statements by stating that Creed would "definitely" reunite and that he expected new material from the band within "the next two years." When asked about Stapp's statements, Tremonti clarified that he was still busy promoting his solo albums and that Alter Bridge would record and tour in 2016, making it unlikely for him to return to Creed within Stapp's proposed timeline.

In September 2015, Stapp announced that Creed would be releasing a new "retrospective" album that November. It would be three discs, one with hits, one with rarities, and the last with acoustic versions of hits. The album--With Arms Wide Open: A Retrospective—was released as a Walmart-exclusive. In 2016, Stapp joined Art of Anarchy. His first album with the band was released in March 2017, and is titled The Madness. Alter Bridge continues to tour and record, while Mark Tremonti released, with his solo metal band Tremonti, his third album Dust in April 2016, and his fourth album, A Dying Machine, in April 2018. Scott Phillips has drummed in the supergroup project Projected, releasing the first album Human (2012) and the second effort the double album Ignite My Insanity (2017). Due to the different members' band projects, touring so far is put aside, focusing more on releasing original music. Scott Stapp has since bridged away from Art of Anarchy, having released his third solo album, The Space Between the Shadows, on July 19, 2019.

In November 2020, drummer Scott Phillips announced that a reunion was a possibility.

Musical style and influences
Creed has been primarily described as alternative rock, alternative metal, post-grunge, and hard rock. Creed also has been categorized, but less frequently, as nu metal, Christian rock, grunge and heavy metal.

Stapp's influences include Otis Redding, Donny Hathaway, Def Leppard, U2, The Doors, and Led Zeppelin. Guitarist Mark Tremonti's influences include thrash metal bands like Slayer, Metallica, Exodus, and Forbidden.

According to a 1999 piece in The Washington Post:The biblical imagery of singer Scott Stapp's lyrics got Creed typed as Christian rock by early listeners, and the band's denial of any religious objective has unsettled some of its more fervent fans. "We are not a Christian band," Stapp insists on the band's web site. "A Christian band has an agenda to lead others to believe in their specific religious beliefs. We have no agenda!" Bassist Brian Marshall, who named the band, has noted that Stapp uses spiritual imagery as a metaphor in his lyrics.

Legacy and reception

Creed was one of the most commercially successful rock bands of the late 1990s and early 2000s. Their first three studio albums, My Own Prison, Human Clay, and Weathered, have all gone multi-platinum in the United States, selling six million, 11 million, and six million copies respectively. The band also won a Grammy Award for Best Rock Song for the song "With Arms Wide Open" in 2001.

However, Creed has been negatively received by some professional critics, such as Robert Christgau. Jonah Weiner of Slate has tried to make the case that the band was "seriously underrated"; Joe Coscarelli of Mediaite countered that "most people hate Creed's combination of overwrought power-balladry and Christian-infused testosterone."  

In 2011, Billboard ranked Creed as the 18th-best artist of the 2000s. In 2013, readers of Rolling Stone magazine voted Creed the worst band of the 1990s.

Band members
Last known line-up
 Scott Stapp – lead vocals (1994–2004; 2009–2012) 
 Mark Tremonti – lead guitar, backing vocals, occasional lead vocals (1994–2004; 2009–2012), bass on Weathered
 Scott Phillips – drums, percussion (1994–2004; 2009–2012), keyboards on Weathered
 Brian Marshall – bass (1994–2000; 2009–2012)
Former members
 Brian Brasher – rhythm guitar (1994–1995) 
Touring musicians
Brett Hestla – bass, backing vocals (2000–2004) 
Eric Friedman – rhythm guitar, backing vocals (2009–2012)

Timeline

Discography

Studio albums
 My Own Prison (1997)
 Human Clay (1999)
 Weathered (2001)
 Full Circle (2009)

Awards and nominations
Grammy Awards
The Grammy Awards are awarded annually by the National Academy of Recording Arts and Sciences of the United States. Creed has won one award out of three nominations. 

American Music Awards
Created by Dick Clark in 1973, the American Music Awards is an annual music awards ceremony and one of several major annual American music awards shows. Creed has received four American Music Award from seven nominations.

MTV Video Music Awards
The MTV Video Music Awards are presented annually by MTV and honor accomplishments in the music video medium. Creed has received two nominations.

MTV Video Music Brazil
Established in 1995, the MTV Video Music Brazil awards, commonly known as VMB, are MTV Brasil's annual award ceremony. Many award winners are chosen by MTV viewers.
{| class="wikitable"
|-
!Year
!Nominated work
!Award
!Result
!Ref.
|-
|align=center|2002
| "My Sacrifice"
| rowspan=2|Best International Video
| 
| 
|-
|align=center|2003
| "Don't Stop Dancing"
| 
|

References

External links

1994 establishments in Florida
2004 disestablishments in Florida
2009 establishments in Florida
2012 disestablishments in Florida
Heavy metal musical groups from Florida
American alternative metal musical groups
Alternative rock groups from Florida
Attic Records (Canada) artists
American post-grunge musical groups
Grammy Award winners
Hard rock musical groups from Florida
Musical groups disestablished in 2012
Musical groups established in 1994
Musical groups disestablished in 2004
Musical groups from Tallahassee, Florida
Musical groups reestablished in 2009
Musical quartets